The Siouxland Veterans Memorial Bridge is a through arch bridge which carries U.S. Route 77 across the Missouri River between Sioux City, Iowa, and South Sioux City, Nebraska.

The bridge replaced the Combination Bridge, so called because it carried both rail and highway traffic, built in 1896. The previous bridge was documented by the Historic American Engineering Record in 1980, prior to its replacement.

The current bridge was dedicated in July 1981, and the previous one was demolished. However, in May 1982 a  crack was discovered in the downstream tie girder. The bridge was hurriedly closed, and measures taken to ensure that it would not collapse into the river, affecting barge traffic. Initially, it was estimated that repairs would take six days; in fact, the bridge was completely closed for seven months, and did not fully re-open to traffic until May 1983.

See also

List of bridges documented by the Historic American Engineering Record in Iowa
List of bridges documented by the Historic American Engineering Record in Nebraska
List of crossings of the Missouri River

References

External links

 of previous bridge

Road bridges in Nebraska
Buildings and structures in Dakota County, Nebraska
Interstate vehicle bridges in the United States
Monuments and memorials in Iowa
Monuments and memorials in Nebraska
Bridges completed in 1981
Through arch bridges in the United States
Buildings and structures in Sioux City, Iowa
Transportation buildings and structures in Woodbury County, Iowa
Road bridges in Iowa
Bridges over the Missouri River
U.S. Route 77
Bridges of the United States Numbered Highway System
1982 establishments in Iowa
1982 establishments in Nebraska